Moon Se-yoon (born May 11, 1982), is a South Korean comedian and television personality. He made his debut in the entertainment industry as a comedian and is a fixed cast member of 2 Days & 1 Night, Amazing Saturday and Delicious Guys.

He is signed with FNC Entertainment.

Filmography

Films

Television series

Television shows

Hosting

Radio shows

Plays

Musical

Theater

Discography

Singles

Awards and nominations

References

External links 

 

1982 births
Living people
South Korean male comedians
People from Seoul
FNC Entertainment artists
South Korean Buddhists
South Korean television personalities